The Book of Nut (original title: The Fundamentals of the Course of the Stars) is a collection of ancient Egyptian astronomical texts, also covering various mythological subjects. These texts focus on the cycles of the stars of the decans, the movements of the moon, the sun, and the planets, on the sundials, and related matters.

This title was given to the book because of the depiction of the sky goddess Nut arching over the earth in some copies of the text. She is supported by the god of the air Shu. Texts in the Book of Nut include material from different periods of Egyptian history.

The original name of the book, The Fundamentals of the Course of the Stars, was discovered by Alexandra von Lieven in one of the manuscript fragments and published in 2007. One of the major themes of the Book of Nut is the concept of sunrise as the mythological rebirth.

Texts

There are nine different copies of the book and they have various dates. Three copies are found on monuments and six more are found in the papyri of the second century AD found in the temple library in ancient Tebtunis, a town in the southern Faiyum Oasis. These include texts both in hieratic and demotic; some parts are written in hieroglyphs as well.

Three texts of the Book of Nut are preserved on monuments: the tomb of Ramses IV, The Cenotaph of Seti I at the Osireion in Abydos, and the tomb of the noblewoman Mutirdis (TT410) of the 26th Dynasty. These monumental copies are written in hieroglyphs.

Currently, the Tebtunis textual material is scattered all over the world due to its complex excavation and acquisition history. There are several thousand fragments of unpublished papyri held by various museums that are being evaluated by scholars.

The most highly prized of the manuscripts are the demotic Carlsberg papyri 1, and 1a, because of their completeness. They were written by the same scribe. Other manuscripts are mostly fragmentary.

There are substantial differences among all of these copies, indicating that the textual tradition of the Book of Nut was still very much alive even in the second century AD.

History of scholarship

The early Egyptologists gave a lot of attention to the astronomical parts of the Book of Nut. First available for modern research was the material from the tomb of Ramses IV, which included the astronomical painting of Nut and the list of the decans. The text was first used by Jean-François Champollion and Ippolito Rosellini, later copied by Heinrich Brugsch. A new edition was issued in 1990 by Erik Hornung.

In 1933, The Cenotaph of Seti I at the Osireion in Abydos was discovered. This was important because this version represents the oldest text.

Adriaan de Buck's translation of the cryptographic sections of the Book of Nut significantly advanced the studies.

In 1977, Jan Assmann published another relevant text from the tomb of the noblewoman Mutirdis, dating to the 26th Dynasty.

Some important new material has been published since 2007.

Dates of composition
Most likely the Book of Nut text evolved over a long period of time going back before the time of Seti I. The astronomical data included in the decan list below the body of Nut point to the 12th Dynasty, the time of Sesostris III.

There are two different decan lists that cannot be reconciled, so one of them must be secondary. According to von Lieven, the Middle Kingdom data is secondary, and she suggests that the earlier list goes back to the Old Kingdom, the first of the three major divisions of dynasties.

See also
Egyptian calendar

Notes

Bibliography
Marshall Clagett, Ancient Egyptian Science, Volume 2: Calendars, clocks, and astronomy. Philadelphia: American Philosophical Society, 1995 
 Jan Assmann: Das Grab der Mutirdis. von Zabern, Mainz 1977, .
 Henri Frankfort: The Cenotaph of Seti I at Abydos (with chapters by Adriaan de Buck and Battiscombe Gunn). Egypt Exploration Society, London 1933.
 Erik Hornung: Zwei ramessidische Königsgräber – Ramses IV. und Ramses VII. von Zabern, Mainz 1990, .
 Hans-Otto Lange, Otto Neugebauer: Papyrus Carlsberg No. 1 – Ein hieratisch-demotischer kosmologischer Text. Munksgaard, Kopenhagen 1940.
 Christian Leitz: Altägyptische Sternuhren. Peeters, Leuven 1995, .
 Christian Leitz: Studien zur ägyptischen Astronomie. Harrassowitz, Wiesbaden 1991, .
 Otto Neugebauer, Richard Anthony Parker: Egyptian astronomical Texts (EAT) – The early decans. Brown University Press, Rhode Island 1960.
 Alexandra von Lieven: Grundriss des Laufes der Sterne. Das sogenannte Nutbuch. The Carsten Niebuhr Institute of Ancient Eastern Studies (u. a.), Kopenhagen 2007, .
 Alexandra von Lieven: Der Himmel über Esna. Eine Fallstudie zur religiösen Astronomie in Ägypten am Beispiel der kosmologischen Decken- und Architravinschriften im Tempel von Esna. Harrassowitz, Wiesbaden 2000, .
Alexandra von Lieven, Translating the Fundamentals of the Course of the Stars. in Annette Imhausen, Tanja Pommerening, eds, Writings of Early Scholars in the Ancient Near East, Egypt, Rome, and Greece: Translating Ancient Scientific Texts. Volume 286 of Beiträge zur Altertumskunde. Walter de Gruyter, 2010

Sources
German Wikipedia

External links

Early Egyptian Constellations - The decan stars, by Gary David Thompson
The Papyrus Carlsberg Collection - Inventory of Published Papyri

Ancient Egyptian religion
Ancient Egyptian texts
Ancient astronomy
Astronomical catalogues
Astronomy in Egypt
Egyptian calendar